Tropical Storm Kai-tak, known in the Philippines as Tropical Storm Urduja, was a late-season tropical cyclone that affected Visayas during December 2017. Forming as the twenty-sixth named storm of the 2017 Pacific typhoon season, Kai-tak formed as a tropical depression near Palau on December 11. Slowly intensifying, the system became a tropical storm on December 14. Due to its slow motion, Kai-tak made landfall in Samar on December 16, and traversed the Philippine islands. Kai-tak later moved in a west-southwestward direction until it dissipated on December 23 near Malaysia.

Meteorological history

On December 10, the Joint Typhoon Warning Center (JTWC) began to monitor on a tropical depression located about 130 km (81 mi) to the east of Palau. The Japan Meteorological Agency (JMA) classified the system as a weak tropical depression the next day, and began issuing advisories on 00:00 UTC of December 12. Nine hours later, the PAGASA declared that the system had intensified into a tropical depression, and was immediately given the local name Urduja. On December 13, the JTWC issued a Tropical Cyclone Formation Alert. On 21:00 UTC of that same day, the JTWC upgraded the system to a tropical depression and also began issuing advisories, giving the identifier 32W. Despite the system being poorly organized with loose banding, the system also was located in an area of very low wind shear. Three hours later, the JMA upgraded the system to a tropical storm, assigning it the international name Kai-tak.

Preparations and impact
On December 14, as soon as PAGASA upgraded Kai-tak (Urduja) to a tropical storm, Public Storm Warning Signal #2 was immediately raised in Eastern Samar, Samar and Biliran. Public Storm Warning Signal #1 was also raised in the majority of Bicol Region (Region V) and much of Visayas while moderate to heavy rainfall were warned within the 400-km diameter of the storm. Residents were already advised to "undertake appropriate measures" against flooding as the moderate to heavy rainfall area was extended to within the 500-km diameter on December 15. PAGASA also announced the possibility of a storm surge of 4.1–14 meters over in Samar. The city of Tacloban was later placed under a state of calamity as decided by their local council as 80 of the 130 villages were flooded. This resulted in at least 728 families (1,418 individuals) brought to evacuation centers or schools.

The NDRRMC confirmed a total of 83 people dead and calculated a total of Php3.747 billion (US$74.3 million) worth of infrastructure and agricultural damages.

Retirement

On December 21, 2017, the PAGASA announced that the name Urduja had been retired from their naming lists after causing more than ₱1 billion worth of damage. In January 2018, PAGASA chose the name Uwan to replace Urduja for future seasons.

Due to the damage and high death toll in Visayas, the name Kai-tak was officially retired during the 50th annual session of the ESCAP/WMO Typhoon Committee in February 2018. In February 2019, the Typhoon Committee subsequently chose Yun-yeung as its replacement name.

See also

Weather of 2017
Tropical cyclones in 2017
Tropical Storm Thelma
Tropical Storm Haikui (2017)

References

External links

JMA General Information of Tropical Storm Kai-tak (1726) from Digital Typhoon
JMA Best Track Data of Tropical Storm Kai-tak (1726) 
32W.KAI-TAK from the U.S. Naval Research Laboratory

2017 disasters in the Philippines
December 2017 events in the Philippines
Typhoons in the Philippines